Emerich Burt Freed (November 22, 1897 – December 4, 1955) was a United States district judge of the United States District Court for the Northern District of Ohio.

Education and career

Born in Budapest, Austria-Hungary (now Hungary) in 1897, Freed attended grammar school there, and graduated from Central High School in Cleveland, Ohio. Freed received an Artium Baccalaureus degree from Western Reserve University (now Case Western Reserve University) in 1918 and a Bachelor of Laws from Case Western Reserve University School of Law in 1920. He was in private practice in Ohio from 1918 to 1929, and was thereafter a first assistant in the Prosecuting Attorney's Office of Cuyahoga County, Ohio from 1929 to 1932, and prosecuting attorney in that office from 1932 to 1933. He was the United States Attorney for the Northern District of Ohio from 1933 to 1941.

Federal judicial service

He was confirmed by the United States Senate on October 2, 1941, and received his commission on October 7, 1941, serving in that capacity until his death on December 4, 1955.

See also
 List of Jewish American jurists

References

Sources
 

1955 deaths
1897 births
Judges of the United States District Court for the Northern District of Ohio
United States district court judges appointed by Franklin D. Roosevelt
20th-century American judges
Austro-Hungarian emigrants to the United States
Lawyers from Cleveland
Case Western Reserve University School of Law alumni
County district attorneys in Ohio
United States Attorneys for the Northern District of Ohio